Harold Clarke (1875 – after 1903) was an English footballer who played in the Football League for Burton United and Everton.

References

1875 births
Date of death missing
English footballers
Association football forwards
English Football League players
Everton F.C. players
Portsmouth F.C. players
Burton United F.C. players
Walsall F.C. players
Crewe Alexandra F.C. players